Lakkia is a village of the Thermi municipality, northern Greece. The 2011 census recorded 438 inhabitants in the village. Lakkia is a part of the community of Vasilika.

See also
List of settlements in the Thessaloniki regional unit

References

Populated places in Thessaloniki (regional unit)